Ruotolo is an Italian surname. Notable people with the surname include:
Dolindo Ruotolo (1882–1970), Italian Roman Catholic priest
Kade Ruotolo, American grappler and youngest-ever ADCC champion 
Gennaro Ruotolo (born 1967), Italian footballer and manager
Onorio Ruotolo (1888–1966), Italian sculptor
Raffaele Ruotolo (born 1965), American soccer player
Riccardo Ruotolo (1928–2012), Italian Roman Catholic bishop
Sandro Ruotolo (born 1955), Italian journalist and politician

See also
Ruotolo Peak, mountain in Antarctica
Rotolo
Otolo

Surnames
Italian-language surnames
Surnames of Italian origin